Horse Creek is a tributary of Goose Creek river in Clay County in the U.S. state of Kentucky.
The Cumberland and Manchester Railway built a spur line up the creek, and it has been the site of operations of at least eight coal mining companies.
The name comes, according to local tradition, from the proliferation of "horseweed" in the creek valley.

Tributaries and post offices 
One of the creek's own tributaries is the Paw Paw Branch, location of Siebert town, railroad depot, and erstwhile postoffice.

The mouth of the Crawfish Branch tributary to the creek is the location of the Crawfish pos toffice, established on March 29, 1907, by postmaster Hugh Gregory.
However, the station on the spur line, a loading depot for the coal mining operations, was named Hima.
On May 4, 1920, then postmaster David Gregory renamed the post office to the name of the railway stop.

Local oral history is that they were named after a large flock of pigeons roosting on timber.

Coal
The coal beneath the creek is part of Kentucky's Breathitt Formation.

Pollution caused by the mining operations was measured in 1969.
The pH of the river water was 4.2 in Horse Creek itself, and 5.8 in Goose Creek.
Fish kills were reported for Goose Creek, and both Goose Creek and downstream South Fork of Kentucky River were occasionally acidic.
The problems of acidic outflow and sediment affecting the downstream waters of Goose continued to be reported in 1979.

The Cumberland and Manchester Railway railway spur was built in 1918, contracted to L.L. Richardson for building the road and John C. White for supplying  of timber for trestles.

See also
List of rivers of Kentucky

References

Sources

Further reading 

 
 

Rivers of Kentucky
Rivers of Clay County, Kentucky